Kikin is a Russian masculine surname, its feminine counterpart is Kikina. It may refer to

 Alexander Kikin (c.1670–1718), advisor to Alexei Petrovich, Tsarevich of Russia
Anatoli Kikin (1940–2012), Russian football player and manager
Anna Kikina (born 1984), Russian engineer and test cosmonaut
 Pyotr Kikin (1775–1834), Russian military hero and slavophile

Russian-language surnames